McClean is an Irish surname. Notable people with the surname include:

 Adam McClean (born c. 1989), British journalist and broadcaster
 Bernie Wright McClean (born 1979), Costa Rican professional footballer
 Christian McClean, English former professional footballer
 Francis McClean (1876–1955), pioneer aviator
 Frank McClean (1837–1904), astronomer and pioneer in spectrography
 James McClean (born 1989), Irish footballer playing for West Bromwich Albion
 Joe McClean (rugby league), rugby league footballer who has played in the 2010s
 John Gerard McClean (1914–1978), Bishop of Middlesbrough, 1967–78
 John Robinson McClean (1813–1873), British civil engineer and Liberal Party politician
 Mike McClean, British television presenter and actor
 Moses McClean (1804–1870), Democratic member of the U.S. House of Representatives from Pennsylvania
 Raymond McClean (1932–2011), Irish nationalist politician
 Sally McClean, Northern Irish statistician, computer scientist, and operations researcher
 Sheila McClean, Irish painter
 Shilo McClean, writer, researcher, public speaker, consultant
 Stacey McClean (born 1989), English singer and member of UK Pop band S Club

See also 
 Clan Maclean
 McClain (disambiguation)
 McClean Lake mine, a uranium mine in Saskatchewan, Canada
 McClean telescope, at the South African Astronomical Observatory
 MacLaine
 McLean (disambiguation)
 McLane (disambiguation)
 Macklin (disambiguation)